The Martyrdom of Saint Andrew is a 1675-1682 oil on canvas painting by Murillo, now in the Museo del Prado. 

Its tone is heavily influenced by the work of Peter Paul Rubens, particularly his own depiction of the same subject, and de Ribera's The Martyrdom of Saint Philip.

References

1680s paintings
Paintings by Bartolomé Esteban Murillo in the Museo del Prado
Paintings depicting Andrew the Apostle